Callisto is a post-metal band from Turku, Finland.

History 
The band was formed in 2001 in Kokkola. Whilst their early works are hardcore/metalcore, their first album True Nature Unfolds has a strong sludge metal and doom influence.  

Recorded in 2004 by the late Mieszko Talarczyk of Nasum fame and introduced to Earache Records a year later through Johannes Persson from Cult of Luna, earning them worldwide distribution. 

The band's sophomore album Noir, released in 2006, still drawing from modern sludge also introduced subtle jazz leanings, heavy use of mellotron and experimentation with unconventional rock instruments such as the saxophone and the flute. 

Their third album Providence, released in 2009, marked another experimental shift in style, taking some distance from the more instrumental material, Callisto composed a vocal record presenting a new member Jani Ala-Hukkala handling the vocals. The songs on "Providence" are built upon layers of melodies, using a broader palette they have coloured their sound with twangy guitars, mellotrons, prog rock overtones and a singing style that can be traced back to 90s-era vocalists like Layne Stayley. 

In 2015 the band returned after some years of relatively quiet existence with a new album Secret Youth – their fourth full length. Secret Youth is a contradictory concoction of more straightforward elements mixed with a strong and somber experimental overtone, or "progressive noise rock" as the band themselves have described it. Callisto's cryptic lyrics often revolve around theological and existential themes and more difficult subjects, such as spiritual abuse.

Callisto has headlined several tours in Europe from 2004 to 2015. They also opened for High on Fire on their 2005 United Kingdom tour. In March 2007 Callisto showcased in Canada and the United States, playing at the Canadian Music Week in Toronto and the South by Southwest festival in Austin, Texas.

Discography

Studio albums
 True Nature Unfolds (2004)
 Noir (2006)
 Providence (2009)
 Secret Youth (2015)

Other releases
 Dying Desire (single, 2001)
 Ordeal of the Century (EP, 2002)
 Jemima/Klimenko (12", 2004)

Current members
Jani Ala-Hukkala - vocals
Markus Myllykangas – guitar, backing vocals
Tero Holopainen – guitar
Juho Niemelä – bass
Ariel Björklund – drums
Arto Karvonen – keyboards
Jani Rättyä - live percussion, backing vocals

References

External links
 Official website
 Svart Records
 [ Callisto at AllMusic Guide]

Finnish post-rock groups
Finnish heavy metal musical groups
Finnish Christian metal musical groups
Post-metal musical groups
Musical groups from Turku
Earache Records artists